Samrat is a 1994 Indian Kannada-language action thriller film written and directed by Naganna, making his debut, and produced by M. Rajashekar. The film starred Vishnuvardhan, Sowmya Kulkarni and Vinaya Prasad. The film's music is scored by Hamsalekha whilst the cinematography is by J.G. Krishna.

The film released on 4 May 1994 to mixed response from critics and audience and became an average grosser.

Cast
Vishnuvardhan as Samrat
Soumya Kulkarni as Sandhya, Samrat's lover
Vinaya Prasad as a dancer (special appearance)
Puneet Issar as Bhandaari 
Vajramuni as police commissioner 
Maanu as Chief minister 
Sudheer as M.L.A
Rockline Venkatesh
Ramesh Bhat as Baasha, Samrat's friend 
Avinash Ekanath, Samrat's best friend and Sandhya's brother (special appearance)
Lohithaswa
Mandeep Roy
Sarigama Viji
Nagendra Shah
Bharat Bhagavatar
Mahesh
Jackie shivu

Soundtrack
The music of the film was composed and lyrics written by Hamsalekha. After release, the soundtrack was well received and the track "Nimakade Sambarandre" became an all-time hit song. Audio was released on Lahari Music label.

References

1994 films
1990s Kannada-language films
Indian action films
Indian crime drama films
Films scored by Hamsalekha
1994 directorial debut films
Films directed by Naganna
1994 action films
1994 crime drama films